Tau Gamma Sigma also known as the Triskelions' Grand Sorority, is a sorority established in the Philippines. Its members call themselves Lady Triskelions. Its fraternity counterpart is Tau Gamma Phi also known as the Triskelions' Grand Fraternity.

History

On January 17, 1969, Tau Gamma Sigma was founded by ten women from the University of the Philippines Diliman. The founders were friends of the Tau Gamma Phi fraternity founders. The women were all political science students and members of the same political science club with the founders of Tau Gamma Phi.
 
The first initiation rites were held in Bustos, Bulacan. Successive batches followed until they reached fifty members from different colleges in UP Diliman. The formal sorority structure was ratified in July 1970.

After the declaration of martial law in 1972, the shared office of Tau Gamma Phi and Tau Gamma Sigma inside UP Diliman was raided under an arrest-search and seizure order signed by then-secretary of defense Juan Ponce Enrile, which resulted in the confiscation of several subversive materials and documents. Both the sorority and the fraternity were critical of the Marcos administration.

Notable members
  Lougee Basabas – lead vocalist of alternative rock band Mojofly and former host of variety show Eat Bulaga!
  Rosmari D. Carandang -  associate justice of the Supreme Court
  Marides C. Fernando - former mayor of Marikina
  Jopay Paguia - former member of dance group SexBomb Girls
  Charee Pineda - actress and city councilor of Valenzuela 
  Angeline Quinto – singer and actress
 Suzette Ranillo - actress, producer and director
 Luzviminda G. Tancangco - former chairperson of the Commission on Elections

See also
 Tau Gamma Phi
 List of fraternities and sororities in the Philippines

References

External links
Tau Gamma Sigma Website
Triskelion Web Portal

Fraternities and sororities in the Philippines
Student societies in the Philippines
Student organizations established in 1969
1969 establishments in the Philippines